James Hadley Snyder, known professionally as Dan Green, is an American voice actor, voice director, and screenwriter. He is best known for being the voice of Yugi Muto/Yami Yugi for Yu-Gi-Oh! Duel Monsters, the anime series version of Yu-Gi-Oh!, as well as all of the character's U.S. series appearances.

Early life
Green attended Rutgers University in New Brunswick, New Jersey.

Career
Green is best known as the voice of Yugi Muto/Yami Yugi in Yu-Gi-Oh! Duel Monsters, Trudge in Yu-Gi-Oh! 5D's, and Knuckles the Echidna in Sonic X and the Sonic the Hedgehog video games (2005–2010). He has worked for 4Kids Entertainment, DuArt Film and Video, NYAV Post, TAJ Productions and Central Park Media. He has also worked on script adaptations of Kurokami: The Animation and Mobile Suit Gundam Unicorn, and teaches voice acting at Edge Studio in New York City.

Personal life
Green married singer and voice actress Michal Lura Friedman, better known as Michal the Girl, in 2008. While giving birth to twins (a son named Jackson and a daughter named Reverie) on November 25, 2011, Friedman died from complications following a C-section. Fans began charity efforts to provide financial support for the twins.

Filmography

Animation
 Angel's Friends - Gas
 Astonishing X-Men: Gifted - Colossus
 The Boy Who Wanted To Be A Bear - Father Bear
 Chaotic - Mezzmarr, Tangath Toborn, Codemaster Imthor and Tartarek
 Huntik: Secrets & Seekers - Montehue, Clease, Zan-Tanos, Lord Casterwill, The Oracle
 GoGoRiki - Pogoriki (4Kids dub)
 Hammerboy - Moonk
 The Incredible Crash Dummies - Crash (4Kids dub)
 Kappa Mikey - Additional Voices
 Pat & Stan - Pat
 Polar Krush - PK The Polar Bear, Gordon the Gorilla, Maurice the Mammoth
 Robotomy - Additional Voices
 Stickin' Around - Additional Voices
 Teenage Mutant Ninja Turtles (2003) - Mortu, Commander Mozar, Mephos, The Professor
 Thumb Wrestling Federation - Ring Announcer, Corbata, Tom Cat, Snagglefangs, Sick Vick
 Viva Piñata - Hudson Horstachio, King Roario
 Vampirina - Boris
 Winx Club - Sky, Pegataur elder (4Kids dub), Ice Guardian/Spirit

Animation Film
 Gladiformers - Patrion Tokal
 The Little Panda Fighter - Pancada
 Ratatoing - Carlos
 Turtles Forever - Leonardo (1987)
 Doraemon: The Record of Nobita's Spaceblazer - Uno (2009)

Dubbing roles
Anime
 Akudama Drive - Headmaster (ep. 7)
 Descendants of Darkness - Asato Tsuzuki
 Dinosaur King - Jonathan
 G.I. Joe Sigma 6 - Lt. Stone
 Patlbor: The TV Series - Fujioka, Asuma Shinohara
 The King of Braves GaoGaiGar - Koutaro Taiga
 Kirby: Right Back at Ya! - N.M.E. Sales Guy, Whispy Woods
 The Legend of Snow White - Prince Richard (episodes 17-52)
 One Piece - Johnny, Mr. 4, Nezumi, Narrator (4Kids)
 Pokémon - Professor Birch, Treecko, Lombre, Spiritomb
 Pokémon: Mewtwo Returns - Mewtwo
 Pokémon Mystery Dungeon: Explorers of Time & Darkness - Grovyle
 Pokémon Mystery Dungeon: Explorers of Sky - Beyond Time & Darkness - Grovyle
 Revolutionary Girl Utena - Soji Mikage
 Shaman King (2001) - Silva, Lee Pai-Long, Zen, Ramiro, Savage Dan
 Shaman King (2021) - Lee Pyron, Silva, Patch Hao
 Sonic X - Knuckles the Echidna
 Yu-Gi-Oh! Duel Monsters - Yugi Muto/Yami Yugi
 Yu-Gi-Oh! Capsule Monsters - Yugi Muto/Yami Yugi
 Yu-Gi-Oh! GX - Yugi Muto/Yami Yugi
 Yu-Gi-Oh! 5Ds - Tetsu Trudge, Guard Robot
 Yu-Gi-Oh! ZEXAL - Tombo Tillbitty

Anime Film

Live-action
 Beautiful Hunter - Man 7
 The Bondage Master - Shiro
 Cutie Honey - Black Claw
 Close Your Eyes and Hold Me - Amane
 Exte: Hair Extensions - Kiyomi's Boyfriend
 The Machine Girl - Yusuke
 Magic in the Water - Radar
 Naughty Guide to Tokyo Nightlife - Tsuruta
 Scorpion's Revenge - Jimmy Yoshioka
 Zero Woman: The Accused - Detective

Video games
 PlayStation All-Stars Battle Royale - Professor
 Shaman King video games - Silva, Lee Pai-Long
 Shaman King: Power of Spirit - Ashcroft, Homunculus, Mysterious Mask
 Shaman King: Master of Spirits - Store Clerk
 Shaman King: Master of Spirits 2 - Store Clerk
 Sonic the Hedgehog (series) - Knuckles the Echidna (2005–10)Shadow the Hedgehog Sonic Riders Sonic '06 Sonic Rivals Sonic and the Secret Rings - Sinbad the Sailor
 Mario & Sonic at the Olympic Games Sonic Rivals 2 Sonic Riders: Zero Gravity Sonic and the Black Knight - Sir Gawain
 Mario & Sonic at the Olympic Winter Games Sonic & Sega All-Stars Racing Teenage Mutant Ninja Turtles video games - Mortu, Commander Mozar (uncredited)
 Battle Nexus Mutant Nightmare The Bureau: XCOM Declassified - Dr. Scott, Major Nigrosh
 Ultimate Muscle: Legends vs. New Generation - Robin Mask, Buffaloman, Warsman
 Yu-Gi-Oh! video games - Yugi Muto/Yami Yugi
 Yu-Gi-Oh! Destiny Board Traveler - Yugi Muto/Yami Yugi
 Yu-Gi-Oh! Capsule Monsters Coliseum - Yugi Muto/Yami Yugi
 Duel Terminals - Trudge
 Yu-Gi-Oh! Duel Links - Yugi Muto/Yami Yugi, Officer Tetsu Trudge
 Power of Chaos: Yugi the Destiny Yu-Gi-Oh! Reshef of Destruction - Yugi Muto/Yami Yugi

Production credits
Dubbing director
 Astonishing X-Men: Gifted Iron Man: Extremis Jungle Emperor Leo (co-directed with Michael Sinterniklaas)
 Knight Hunters Eternity Mobile Suit Gundam Unicorn (co-directed with Michael Sinterniklaas and Marc Diraison)
 Phoenix Samurai Deeper Kyo Shura no Toki: Age of Chaos The GokusenScript adaptation
 Domain of Murder Knight Hunters Eternity Kurokami: The Animation (co-written with Marc Diraison)
 Mobile Suit Gundam Unicorn (co-written with Michael Sinterniklaas and Stephanie Sheh)
 Phoenix Queen's Blade Revolutionary Girl Utena Seven of Seven Shura no Toki: Age of ChaosMiscellaneous crew
 G.I. Joe: Sigma 6 (co-executive producer)
 Iron Man: Extremis'' (casting director, audio producer)

Notes

References

External links
 
 
 
 

Living people
American casting directors
American male screenwriters
American male television writers
American male video game actors
American male voice actors
American television writers
Juilliard School alumni
People from San Rafael, California
Rutgers University alumni
Screenwriters from California
American voice directors
20th-century American male actors
21st-century American male actors
Year of birth missing (living people)